The men's horizontal bar competition at the 2014 Asian Games in Incheon, South Korea was held on 21 and 25 September 2014 at the Namdong Gymnasium.

Schedule
All times are Korea Standard Time (UTC+09:00)

Results

Qualification

Final

References

Qualification
Final

External links
Official website

Artistic Men horizontal bar